Abercamlais is a Grade I listed country house in the Usk valley between Brecon and Sennybridge in Powys, Wales. Possibly dating back to the Middle Ages, it underwent various alterations and additions during the nineteenth century accounting for all or most of what may be seen today. Also of note is an early eighteenth century octagonal dovecote. The gardens attached to the house extend on both sides of the Usk and are connected by both a grade II* listed Elizabethan three arch stone bridge and a wrought iron suspension bridge constructed by Crawshay Bailey in the middle of the nineteenth century.  It is considered a fine piece of Victorian engineering and listed by Cadw accordingly.

Less than half a mile downstream is Penpont Manor House with which comparisons are made, the two houses having some shared history.

References

Country houses in Powys
Grade I listed buildings in Powys
Grade I listed houses